Enhaut is an unincorporated community and census-designated place (CDP) located in Swatara Township, Dauphin County, Pennsylvania, United States. The community was formerly part of the census-designated place of Bressler-Enhaut-Oberlin, before splitting into three separate CDPs for the 2010 census.  As of the 2010 census, the population in Enhaut was 1,007.

Enhaut is bordered to the southwest by the borough of Steelton, to the southeast by Bressler, and to the northeast by Oberlin.

Demographics

References

Census-designated places in Dauphin County, Pennsylvania
Census-designated places in Pennsylvania